Jerome Charvet is a French actor who has appeared in international films and TV series since 2011.

Biography 
Jerome Charvet was born in Paris, France. His grandfather, Raymond Carré, is the three-star general in the French Army medical department who designed the entire training program for the first French astronauts, Jean-Loup Chrétien and Patrick Baudry. His father Christian Charvet is a sculptor.

After training at the Cours Florent acting school in Paris, he moved to New York City at the early age of 19. There he studied at the Lee Strasberg Theatre and Film Institute under the tutelage of Paul Calderon and Irma Sandrey, two members of The Actors Studio. He then got accepted into the Stella Adler Studio of Acting and studied with master teacher Ron Burrus, former assistant of Stella Adler. He started out his career on stage at the Manhattan Repertory Theatre and the Roy Arias Theatre.

After starring in the independent movie Falling Overnight shot in Los Angeles, his film career kicked off in Paris in 2013 with Amour et turbulences (Love Is in the Air), directed by Alexandre Castagnetti, with French actors Ludivine Sagnier and Nicolas Bedos. That same year, he also lent his voice to Follow Me, a campaign for the fashion brand Maje, where he plays a young man torn between three Parisian women. He then starred with Jean Reno in the TV series Jo, which was broadcast in 140 country. In 2014, he played opposite Gérard Depardieu in the movie United Passions directed by Frédéric Auburtin, also starring Tim Roth and Sam Neill. The movie recounts the story of the FIFA World Cup's creation and was in the Cannes Film Festival official selection.

In 2018, he portrayed a former ISIS hostage helping Susan Sarandon find her captive son in the movie Viper Club, starring Matt Bomer and Edie Falco. This feature film directed by Maryam Keshavarz and produced by YouTube Originals was selected at the Toronto Film Festival, where Jerome Charvet and the rest of the cast attended the premiere.

In 2019, he played one of the lead roles in Trick, by Patrick Lussier, starring Omar Epps and Jamie Kennedy.

In 2021, he stars in the second season of Hunters, produced by Amazon Studios.

Filmography 
 Features
 2011:  Falling Overnight by Conrad Jackson
 2013:  Love Is in the Air by Alexandre Castagnetti
 2014: United Passions by Frédéric Auburtin
 2018: Viper Club by Maryam Keshavarz
 2019: Trick by Patrick Lussier

 Short films
 2005: Teresa by Menguc Tanriseven
 2011: Sand by Sophie Sherman
 2013: La vie de rêve by David Tamayo
 2019: Too Close by Emily O'Brien

 Television
 2013: Jo by René Balcer
2021: Newton's Cradle by Tamer Mohsen
2021: Hunters by David Weil and Jordan Peele

References

External links 
 
 Jerome Charvet Official website

Living people
21st-century French male actors
French male film actors
French male television actors
Male actors from Paris
Year of birth missing (living people)